Cordula Möller (born 21 June 1968) is a Namibian professional racing cyclist. In 2008, she won the Namibian National Road Race Championships.

References

External links
 

1968 births
Living people
Namibian female cyclists
21st-century Namibian women